Sardar Surjit Singh Randhawa (10 October 1951 – 6 January 1984) was an Indian field hockey player, who played for India men's national field hockey team at the 1976 Montreal Olympics. He was a full back and captain of India field hockey team. He got his training from DSP Ajit Singh Ahluwalia.

Early life and education
Born in Batala, Punjab, Singh studied in Guru Nanak School, Batala, and later at Lyallpur Khalsa College at Jalandhar, where he started playing university level hockey tournaments.

Career
After finishing college he joined the Punjab Police Force for a few years. He made his debut in the second Hockey World Cup in Amsterdam in 1973. He also played for India in the Munich Olympics in 1972, the 1974 and 1978 Asian Games, the 1976 Montreal Olympics, the Asian Games in Bangkok in 1978, and the 1982 World Cup held at Bombay. He was also the part of the winning team in 1975 Hockey World Cup in Kuala Lumpur. He was the first to score for India in the 1975 World Cup. He was included in the World Hockey XI in 1973 and the All-Star Hockey XI the next year. He was also the top scorer-both in the Esanda International hockey Tournament at Perth in Australia and the 1978 Asian Games. In his career he was able to score 4 Olympic goals. Initially he worked briefly with Indian Railways and Indian Airlines and finally with Punjab Police.

Personal life
His wife Chanchal Randhawa was also international field hockey player, who led India women's national field hockey team in the 1970s.
His Son Sarbrinder Singh Randhawa was a world-level Lawn Tennis Player, who represented India in various international tournaments across the world. He is also an Asian Games Runners up which were held in Indonesia.

Death and legacy
Surjit Singh died in a car accident in 1984 near Kartarpur in Jalandhar district after his retirement from the game. The hockey stadium in Jalandhar, the Surjit Hockey Stadium, is named after him. In 2000, with the persistent efforts of Surjit Singh's family, the ancestral village of Surit Singh was renamed after him. Initially it was called "Dakhla", but now it is known as "Surjit Singh Wala"

A hockey academy named after him is also being run by the Government of Punjab. In 1984, after his death, the Surjit Hockey Society was established in Jalandhar, and it organizes the annual Surjit Memorial Hockey Tournament in Jalandhar, every year, In 2007, with the efforts of Surjit Singh's family, a statue was installed in Batala to commemorate the legendary hockey player.

In 2012, in an effort to revive the sport in the state, Government of Punjab announced its decision to support the society. He was posthumously awarded the Arjuna Award  in 1998.

References

External links
 Surjit Singh Randhawa, Biography
 
 

1951 births
1984 deaths
Olympic field hockey players of India
Field hockey players at the 1976 Summer Olympics
Indian male field hockey players
Indian Sikhs
Road incident deaths in India
Recipients of the Arjuna Award
Asian Games silver medalists for India
Indian police officers
Asian Games medalists in field hockey
Field hockey players at the 1974 Asian Games
Field hockey players at the 1978 Asian Games
Field hockey players from Jalandhar
Medalists at the 1978 Asian Games
Medalists at the 1974 Asian Games